An agricultural watchtower (Phoenician name: shomōr;  shomerā;  qāsr, "a castle") was a type of building in the ancient Middle East for farmers to watch over farmland (usually vineyards) during the harvest period.

Description 
The structures usually had two storeys, with a thick-walled lower floor made of untreated stone for storage of the harvest, and an upper floor that functioned as a watchtower. The temperature inside the structure was relatively cool due to the thick wall of the lower floor, allowing the storage of crops such as grapes, which would otherwise start to ferment. During the harvest period, farmworkers or entire families could live in the watchtower rather than return to their home each day.
 
British explorers Conder and Kitchener mentioned the vineyard towers as a remnant of ancient Jewish architecture. They described them as "solid and rude buildings" that can be found close to ancient tombs and rock-cut wine presses.

In scripture 

 
The Book of Isaiah mentions an vineyard tower:

It is also mentioned in the Gospel of Mark:

Today 
Remains of watchtowers are found throughout Syria and Palestine, and some are still in use.

References

Bibliography 
 
 John A. Beck (2011). Zondervan Dictionary of Biblical Imagery. Watchtower. p. 267.
 Vineyard and Grape Pressing Life in the Holy Land.

Fortified towers by type
 
Jewish buildings